The 2013 Cork Premier Intermediate Hurling Championship was the tenth staging of the Cork Premier Intermediate Hurling Championship since its establishment by the Cork County Board in 2004. The championship began on 1 June 2013 and ended on 13 October 2013.

On 5 October 2013, Ballincollig were relegated from the championship following a 1-14 to 0-16 defeat by Carrigaline.

On 13 October 2013, Youghal won the championship following a 0-11 to 0-10 defeat of Castlelyons in the final. This remains their only championship title in the grade.

Tracton's Ronan Walsh was the championship's top scorer with Ronan Walsh 2-46.

Team changes

To Championship

Promoted from the Cork Intermediate Hurling Championship
 Kilworth

Relegated from the Cork Senior Hurling Championship
 Cloyne

From Championship

Promoted to the Cork Senior Hurling Championship
 Ballinhassig

Relegated to the Cork Intermediate Hurling Championship
 Aghabullogue

Results

Round 1

Round 2

Round 3

Round 4

Relegation play-off

Quarter-finals

Semi-finals

Final

Championship statistics

Scoring events

Widest winning margin: 18 points
Inniscarra 1-07 – 4-16 Youghal (Semi-final)
Most goals in a match: 9
Carrigaline 5-10 - 4-17 Ballyhea (Round 1)
Most points in a match: 39
Carrigaline 2-17 - 1-22 Kilworth (Round 2)
Most goals by one team in a match: 5
Carrigaline 5-10 - 4-17 Ballyhea (Round 1)
Cloyne 5-09 – 2-19 Blarney (Round 2)
Most goals scored by a losing team: 5
Cloyne 5-09 – 2-19 Blarney (Round 2)
Most points scored by a losing team: 17 
Carrigaline 2-17 - 1-22 Kilworth (Round 2)

Top scorers

Top scorer overall

Top scorers in a single game

References

External links

 2013 Cork PIHC results

Cork Premier Intermediate Hurling Championship
Cork Premier Intermediate Hurling Championship